The Power Smashers is a professional women's volleyball team playing in the Premier Volleyball League. The team is owned by the city government of Laoag.

History
The team debuted in the Premier Volleyball League (PVL) in the 1st season reinforced open conference (April 30, 2017).

Name changes
 Laoag Power Smashers (2016)
 Power Smashers (2017)

Current roster

Coaching staff
 Head coach: Ernesto Pamilar
 Assistant coach(es): Alegro Carpio Ariel dela Cruz

Team Staff
 Team Manager: 
 Team Trainer: Roberto Javier

Medical Staff
 Team Physician:
 Physical Therapist:

Previous roster

Coaching staff
 Head coach: Ernesto Pamilar
 Assistant coach(s): Alegro Carpio

Team Staff
 Team Manager: 
 Team Trainer: Roberto Javier

Medical Staff
 Team Physician:
 Physical Therapist: Ariel dela Cruz

Coaching staff
 Head coach: Ernesto Pamilar
 Assistant coach(s): Alegro Carpio

Team Staff
 Team Manager: 
 Team Utility: 

Medical Staff
 Team Physician:
 Physical Therapist:

Honors

Team

Individual

Imports

Team captains
  Jovielyn Grace Prado (2017)

Coaches
 Ernesto Pamilar (2017)

Former players 

Local players

 Katherine Villegas
 Joyce Sta. Rita
 Charlemagne Simborio
 Alexandra Denice Tan

Foreign players

 Kannika Thipachot
 Amporn Hyapha

References

2016 establishments in the Philippines
Volleyball clubs established in 2016
Premier Volleyball League (Philippines)
Women's volleyball teams in the Philippines